Nils Herman Dahlbäck (7 March 1891 – 16 July 1968) was a Swedish rower who competed in the 1912 Summer Olympics. He won a silver medal in the coxed four, inriggers, and failed to reach the finals of the eight tournament. Dahlbäck worked as a customs inspector in Malmö.

References

1891 births
1968 deaths
Swedish male rowers
Olympic rowers of Sweden
Rowers at the 1912 Summer Olympics
Olympic silver medalists for Sweden
Olympic medalists in rowing
Medalists at the 1912 Summer Olympics
Sportspeople from Malmö